, which stands for Multi Access (originally Magnetic-electronic Automatic) seat Reservation System, is a train ticket reservation system used by the railway companies of former Japanese National Railways, currently Japan Railways Group (JR Group) and travel agencies in Japan, developed jointly by Hitachi and the Railway Information Systems Co., Ltd (JR Systems), a JR Group company jointly owned by the seven members of the group.

Outline
The host of the system is located in Kokubunji, Tokyo, and managed by JR Systems.

Ticket offices at JR stations equipped with MARS terminals are called , selling tickets of all JR Group trains and partly highway buses and route buses and ferries. It is possible for passengers to reserve tickets of buses and trains from one month prior to the given trip.

Currently the Midori no Madoguchi is named by JR Group excluding JR Central.

History
The MARS-1 system was created by Mamoru Hosaka, Yutaka Ohno, and others at the Japanese National Railways' R&D Institute (now the Railway Technical Research Institute), and was built in 1958. It was the world's first seat reservation system for trains. The MARS-1 was capable of reserving seat positions, and was controlled by a transistor computer with a central processing unit consisting of a thousand transistors.

The latest version of MARS uses the MARS 501 system which was introduced in 2002.

Gallery

References

External links
 JR Systems

Passenger rail transport in Japan
Travel technology
Computer-related introductions in 1960
Train-related introductions in 1960
1960 software
Computer reservation systems
Route planning software
Hitachi